Thundering Hoofs is a 1942 American Western film directed by Lesley Selander and starring Tim Holt. It was the first of many films Holt made with Selander.

Plot
In the Old West, Bill Underwood falls out with his father, Dave Underwood, and chooses the life of a cowhand rather than take charge of his father's stage line. En route to the town of Durango, Bill and his pals, Smokey Ryan and Whopper Hatch, prevent a holdup of the Kellogg Stage Line, which Dave has been trying to purchase. Dave's lawyer, Steve Farley, has been double crossing Dave in the negotiations for the stage line by misrepresenting the offer. Bill discovers Farley has been corrupting the stage drivers working for Mr. Kellogg and his daughter, Nancy.

Bill assumes the surname "Dawson" and hires out as a driver for the Kelloggs. Farley attempts to plant stolen mail with Bill, but Bill and his pals thwart the plan. Farley discovers Bill's true identity and tells Nancy that Bill is an Underwood spy. Nancy fires Bill and intends to drive the stage herself to save the mail contract. Knowing that Farley and his men intend to holdup the stage, Bill and his pals intervene and deliver the mail to its proper destination. Dave arrives in Durango and implicates Farley.

Cast
Tim Holt as Bill Underwood
Ray Whitley as 'Smokey' Ryan
Lee 'Lasses' White as 'Whopper' Hatch
Luana Walters as Nancy Kellogg
Archie Twitchell as Steve Farley
Gordon De Main as Dave Underwood
Charles R. Phipps as Mr. Kellogg (credited as Charles Phipps)
Monte Montague as Slick, a Henchman
Joseph E. Bernard as Hank, the Stage Driver (credited as Joe Bernard)
Frank Fanning as Postal Inspector
Fred Scott as Dave Armstrong
Frank Ellis as Carver, a Henchman
 uncredited
Ken Card as Banjo Player
Spade Cooley as Fiddler
Phil Dunham as Clem, a Telegrapher
Lloyd Ingraham as Telegrapher #2
Bob Kortman as Henchman
Richard Martin as Man at Dance
Frank O'Connor as Reluctant Stage Driver
Francis Sayles as Clerk

References

External links

American Western (genre) films
1942 Western (genre) films
Films produced by Bert Gilroy
Films directed by Lesley Selander
RKO Pictures films
American black-and-white films
Films scored by Paul Sawtell
1940s English-language films
1940s American films